Alexander Börje Achinioti-Jönsson (born 17 April 1996) is a Swedish footballer who plays for Canadian club Forge FC as a midfielder.

Club career

Helsingborgs IF
On 1 May 2014, Achinioti-Jönsson made his professional debut for Helsingborgs IF as an injury-time substitute in a Swedish Cup match against Malmö FF. Four days later on 5 May, he made his league debut as a 27th-minute substitute against AIK.

In 2015, during a U21 match against IFK Göteborg, Achinioti-Jönsson was hospitalized due to a high heart rate. Shortly after being released from hospital, he suffered a concussion which kept him sidelined for two months. After returning to training, he had another heart episode during a workout which sent him to the hospital once again. On this occasion, he was not cleared to return to training until the end of the season, when doctors finally determined that his heartrate issues were benign. As a result of these health issues, Achinioti-Jönsson missed out on a large amount of training and was only able to make one first-team appearance all season.

In 2016, Achinioti-Jönsson made 14 league appearances for Helsingborg, including five starts.

In 2017, after Helsingborg was relegated, Achinioti-Jönsson made 15 league appearances, including 12 starts.

Loan to Ängelholms FF
In August 2017, Achinioti-Jönsson was loaned to Division 1 side Ängelholms FF.

IFK Värnamo
On 30 January 2018, Achinioti-Jönsson signed with Superettan club IFK Värnamo. He made 27 league appearances for Värnamo that season, scoring four goals.

Forge FC

2019 
On 31 January 2019, Achinioti-Jönsson signed with Canadian Premier League club Forge FC. He made his debut for Forge on 27 April 2019, in the Canadian Premier League's first game in history, a 1–1 draw against York9 FC. He ended up making 27 out of a possible 28 appearances for Forge in the club's inaugural season and helped the team become the first ever league champions, as Forge defeated Cavalry FC over two legs in the 2019 Canadian Premier League Finals.

2020 
Achinioti-Jönsson appeared in all 11 games for Forge FC in the 2020 CPL season. He scored the winning goal in the 2020 Canadian Premier League Final when Forge defeated HFX Wanderers FC 2–0 to win their second consecutive league title.

2021 
In his third season with Forge, he was unable to win a third championship, but had a successful individual season nonetheless, recording the second-best passing accuracy in the league and being named in the Team of the Week four times, as both a defender and a midfielder. In January 2022 he was re-signed to a multi-year deal.

2022
In 2022, Achinioti-Jönsson played the majority of the season at the centre-back position due to injuries on the team. The change of position was successful as he nominated for CPL Player of the Year award and was the winner of the league's Defender of the Year award.

On 31 July Alex played in his 100th game for Forge FC across all competitions. At the following home match he was presented with a commemorative jersey with his last name and the kit number 100.

International career
Achinioti-Jönsson has represented Sweden internationally at the U19 level.

Honours

Club
Forge FC
Canadian Premier League: 2019, 2020, 2022
CPL Defender of the Year: 2022

References

External links
 
 
 
 

1996 births
Living people
Association football midfielders
Swedish men's footballers
Footballers from Skåne County
Swedish expatriate footballers
Expatriate soccer players in Canada
Swedish expatriate sportspeople in Canada
Helsingborgs IF players
Ängelholms FF players
IFK Värnamo players
Forge FC players
Allsvenskan players
Ettan Fotboll players
Superettan players
Canadian Premier League players
Sweden youth international footballers